Margaret Joyce Cooper (18 April 1909 – 22 July 2002), later known by her married name Joyce Badcock, was an English competitive swimmer who represented Great Britain at the Olympics and European championships, and England at the British Empire Games, during the late 1920s and early 1930s.

Swimming career
At the 1928 Summer Olympics in Amsterdam, she won a silver medal in the 4×100-metre freestyle relay, and a pair of bronze medals in the 100-metre freestyle and 100-metre backstroke events.  In the 100-metre freestyle she finished together with Jean McDowell, but the judges gave the bronze medal to Cooper in a 3–2 vote.

Cooper also won one gold, four silver and one bronze medals at the 1927 and 1931 European championships, and, while representing England, four gold medals at the 1930 British Empire Games.

When Los Angeles hosted the 1932 Summer Olympics, she won a bronze in the women's 4×100-metre freestyle relay.  In individual competition, she was fourth in the 400-metre freestyle, and sixth in the 100-metre backstroke.

Personal life
Cooper was born in the British island colony of Ceylon (now Sri Lanka), where her father owned a tea plantation. In 1934 she married British Olympic rowing champion John Badcock. Their eldest son Felix Badcock won a bronze medal in rowing at the 1958 British Empire and Commonwealth Games in Cardiff, Wales and their younger son Francis 'David' M Badcock (born 1937), also rowed for the Thames RC and was a reserve for 1958 Commonwealth games crew in addition to rowing in the 1958 boat race.

See also
 List of members of the International Swimming Hall of Fame
 List of Olympic medalists in swimming (women)

References

 

1909 births
2002 deaths
People from Central Province, Sri Lanka
Commonwealth Games gold medallists for England
English female swimmers
European Aquatics Championships medalists in swimming
Female backstroke swimmers
English female freestyle swimmers
Olympic bronze medalists in swimming
Olympic bronze medallists for Great Britain
Olympic silver medallists for Great Britain
Olympic swimmers of Great Britain
Swimmers at the 1928 Summer Olympics
Swimmers at the 1930 British Empire Games
Swimmers at the 1932 Summer Olympics
Medalists at the 1932 Summer Olympics
Medalists at the 1928 Summer Olympics
Olympic silver medalists in swimming
Commonwealth Games medallists in swimming
Medallists at the 1930 British Empire Games